Tricholosporum subgoniospermum is a species of fungus in the family Tricholomataceae. Known from Hungary, the species was described as new to science in 1999.

References

External links

subgoniospermum
Fungi of Europe
Fungi described in 1999